Hanau, Germany was bombed by British bombers (277 Lancasters and 8 Mosquitos of Nos 1 and 8 Groups) on 19 March 1945 during World War II, a few days before it was taken by the US Army. 85% of the city was destroyed. Hanau lost its old monuments, and the medieval section of the city was levelled. The ancient castle, arsenal, city theater and the birthhouse of the Grimm brothers were destroyed. Only half of the Walloon church still stands today. Hanau became a major garrison town in the late 19th century and was (and is) an important junction on the German railway system.

References 
 Hans-Günter Stahl: Der Luftkrieg über dem Raum Hanau 1939-1945 = Hanauer Geschichtsblätter 48. Hanau 2015.
 Richard Schaffer-Hartmann: Die Nacht, als Hanau unterging 19. März 1945. Deutsche Städte im Bombenkrieg. Verlag: Wartberg 2004, .
 James Stern: Die unsichtbaren Trümmer. Eine Reise im besetzten Deutschland 1945. Eichborn, Frankfurt am Main 2004, .
 Jörg Friedrich: Der Brand. Deutschland im Bombenkrieg 1940–1945. Propyläen, München 2002, 11. Auflage, .

Hanau
1945 in Germany
Germany–United Kingdom military relations